La Luz is a town in the municipality of Pajacuarán, in the central Mexican state of Michoacán. As of 2010, the town had a population of 3,689.

References

Populated places in Michoacán